The Buckland riot was an anti-Chinese race riot that occurred on 4 July 1857, in the goldfields of the Buckland Valley, Victoria, Australia, near present-day Porepunkah.  At the time approximately 2000 Chinese and 700 European migrants were living in the Buckland area.

Riot
Anti-Chinese sentiment was widespread during the Victorian gold rush.  This resentment manifested on 4 July 1857 when around 100 European rioters attacked Chinese settlements.  The rioters had just left a public meeting at the Buckland Hotel where the riot ringleaders decided they would attempt to expel all the Chinese in the Buckland Valley.  Contemporaneous newspaper reports claim that the riot was "led by Americans 'inflamed by liquor'".

During the riot Chinese miners were beaten and robbed then driven across the Buckland River. At least three Chinese miners died reportedly of ill-health and entire encampments and a recently constructed Joss house were destroyed.

Police arrested thirteen European accused rioters, however the empaneled juries acquitted all of major offences "amid the cheers of bystanders".  The verdicts of the juries were later criticized in the press.

One of the police involved in the arrests was Robert O'Hara Burke, later of the infamous Burke and Wills expedition.

Aftermath
The Chinese miners were invited to return to the Buckland Valley, however only fifty did so.

The Buckland Riot has been compared to the Eureka Stockade uprising in size and intensity, but is not remembered such.

A commemorative monument was unveiled in July 2007 to mark the 150th anniversary of the riot.

See also

 Lambing Flat riots (1860 - 1861)
 White Australia policy
 Chinese massacre of 1871 in United States
 San Francisco riot of 1877 in United States
 Rock Springs massacre, 1885 in United States
 Attack on Squak Valley Chinese laborers, 1885 in United States
 Tacoma riot of 1885 in United States
 Seattle riot of 1886 in United States
 Hells Canyon massacre, 1887 in United States
 Torreón massacre, 1911 in Mexico

External links
 Trial coverage in The Argus.
 Report and photos on the unveiling of the Buckland memorial in "Activities: Buckland memorial". Chinese Australian Family Historians of Victoria. 2007 by Chris Neelima Lee.
 Photos of monument dedication, 1 July 2007, "Buckland Riots". Monument Australia.

References

Anti-Chinese sentiment in Australia
Victoria (Australia) gold rushes
Australian gold rushes
1857 in Australia
1857 riots
History of Victoria (Australia)
Chinese-Australian history
1850s in Victoria (Australia)
July 1857 events
Race riots in Australia
Riots and civil disorder in Victoria (Australia)